26th NSFC Awards
January 5, 1992

Best Film: 
 Life Is Sweet 
The 26th National Society of Film Critics Awards, given on 5 January 1992, honored the best filmmaking of 1991.

Winners

Best Picture 
1. Life Is Sweet
2. Naked Lunch
3. Bugsy

Best Director 
1. David Cronenberg – Naked Lunch
2. Mike Leigh – Life Is Sweet
3. Jonathan Demme – The Silence of the Lambs

Best Actor 
1. River Phoenix – My Own Private Idaho
2. Warren Beatty – Bugsy
3. Nick Nolte – The Prince of Tides

Best Actress 
1. Alison Steadman – Life Is Sweet
2. Jodie Foster – The Silence of the Lambs
3. Susan Sarandon – Thelma & Louise

Best Supporting Actor 
1. Harvey Keitel – Thelma & Louise, Bugsy and Mortal Thoughts
2. Steven Hill – Billy Bathgate
3. Elliott Gould – Bugsy

Best Supporting Actress 
1. Jane Horrocks – Life Is Sweet
2. Juliette Lewis – Cape Fear
3. Judy Davis – Naked Lunch

Best Screenplay 
1. David Cronenberg – Naked Lunch
2. James Toback – Bugsy
3. Agnieszka Holland – Europa Europa
3. Calder Willingham – Rambling Rose

Best Cinematography 
1. Roger Deakins – Barton Fink
2. Peter Suschitzky – Naked Lunch
3. Allen Daviau – Bugsy

Best Foreign Language Film 
1. The Double Life of Veronique (La double vie de Véronique)
2. The Vanishing (Spoorloos)
3. Europa Europa

Best Documentary 
1. Paris Is Burning
2. Hearts of Darkness: A Filmmaker's Apocalypse
3. American Dream
3. Madonna: Truth or Dare

Experimental Film 
Archangel

Special Citation 
Peter Delpeut – Lyrical Nitrate

References

External links
Past Awards

1990
National Society of Film Critics Awards
National Society of Film Critics Awards
National Society of Film Critics Awards